Dallas Jeffrey Jaye (born June 19, 1993) is a soccer coach and former professional player who played as a goalkeeper. He is currently an assistant coach for the Saint Mary's Gaels men's soccer team. Born in the United States, he represented Guam internationally.

Career

College soccer
Born in Danville, California, Jaye signed a letter of intent to play college soccer for the South Florida Bulls. He also played college soccer for the Xavier Musketeers.

Early professional career 
He played for FC Tucson between 2013 and 2015. He signed with United Soccer League club FC Cincinnati, spending the 2016 and 2017 seasons with them. In October 2017, the club announced they would not exercise their option to have Jaye return in the 2018 season. He spent the 2018 season with Phoenix Rising.

Greenville Triumph 
On February 5, 2019, Jaye joined USL League One side Greenville Triumph ahead of their inaugural season. At the conclusion of the 2019 season, Jaye was named the league's inaugural Goalkeeper of the Year and Golden Glove winner. The 2020 season saw Greenville finish the 2020 regular season in first place and won the League One Championship for the first time. Jaye repeated as Goalkeeper of the Year and Golden Glove winner at the conclusion of the season. During the 2021 League One season, his final season with Greenville, he helped lead the team to another League One Championship final which they ultimately lost to Union Omaha.

Monterey Bay 
On January 19, 2022, Jaye joined USL Championship expansion side Monterey Bay, the second player announced for their roster ahead of their inaugural season. On April 2, 2022, Jaye made his debut for Monterey Bay, during a 2-1 defeat against Sacramento Republic FC. On May 21, 2022, Jaye earned his first shutout for Monterey Bay, during a 2-0 victory over Louisville City FC. Dallas's retirement was announced by Monterey Bay FC on July 18, 2022, with effect from July 23, after which he would join the coaching staff at Saint Mary’s College of California. Jaye played his final professional game on July 23, 2022, coming on as a substitute during a 2-0 win over New York Red Bulls II.

International
Jaye made his international debut for Guam in 2012.

Honors

Club

Greenville Triumph 

 USL League One Championship: 2020

Individual 

 USL League One Golden Glove: 2020, 2021
 USL League One Goalkeeper of the Year: 2020, 2021

References

External links 

 

1993 births
Living people
American soccer players
Association football goalkeepers
FC Cincinnati (2016–18) players
FC Tucson players
Greenville Triumph SC players
Monterey Bay FC players
Guam international footballers
Guamanian footballers
People from Danville, California
Phoenix Rising FC players
Soccer players from California
South Florida Bulls men's soccer players
Sportspeople from the San Francisco Bay Area
USL Championship players
USL League One players
USL League Two players
Xavier Musketeers men's soccer players
Saint Mary's Gaels men's soccer coaches
IMG Academy alumni
De Anza Force players